Iridia Salazar Blanco (born June 14, 1982) is a Mexican taekwondo practitioner and Olympic medalist. She competed at the 2004 Summer Olympics in Athens, where she received a bronze medal in the 57 kg class.  She plays soccer too in Club Casa Blanca Juriquilla

Salazar won a silver medal at the 2001 World Taekwondo Championships in Jeju, and also a silver medal at the 2003 World Taekwondo Championships in Garmisch Partenkirchen. She carried the flag for her native country at the opening ceremony of the 2007 Pan American Games in Rio de Janeiro, Brazil, where she won a gold medal.

In 2011 Salazar entered in politics when assumed office as Deputy of the LXI Legislature of the Mexican Congress.

References

1982 births
Living people
Mexican female taekwondo practitioners
Taekwondo practitioners at the 2004 Summer Olympics
Taekwondo practitioners at the 2007 Pan American Games
Olympic bronze medalists for Mexico
Olympic taekwondo practitioners of Mexico
Olympic medalists in taekwondo
Medalists at the 2004 Summer Olympics
Women members of the Chamber of Deputies (Mexico)
Members of the Chamber of Deputies (Mexico)
National Action Party (Mexico) politicians
Pan American Games gold medalists for Mexico
21st-century Mexican politicians
21st-century Mexican women politicians
Pan American Games medalists in taekwondo
World Taekwondo Championships medalists
Medalists at the 2007 Pan American Games
Medalists at the 2003 Pan American Games
Deputies of the LXI Legislature of Mexico
21st-century Mexican women